"Gold" is the debut solo single by American singer Victoria Justice, released on June 18, 2013, by Columbia Records. The song was written by Tove Lo, Jason Weiss, Sam Shrieve, Ben Camp, Jakob Jerlström, Ludvig Söderberg, and Peter Thomas. It was released as the originally-intended lead single for Justice's debut studio album but was later scrapped after her split with Columbia Records due to creative differences.

Background
Justice first initiated her music career on the Nickelodeon TV show Victorious. She recorded the series' first featured song "Make It Shine", which was also the show's theme song. Several other songs were featured in the series, including "You're the Reason", "Beggin' on Your Knees" and "Best Friend's Brother". Justice performed her debut official single, "Freak the Freak Out", during the Victorious special episode of the same name. In a 2010 interview with the Associated Press, she stated that she was recording an album but would take her time with the process, rather than rush it. In October 2012, she revealed she would release her debut album in 2013, stating "It's going to be pop".

On June 6, 2013, Justice described material from her album: When you hear these songs...the people that know me are like, 'This is so Vic!' It's 100 percent my personality, messages I want to get across. Some of the songs are really fun, upbeat stuff you can dance to, and then I have some songs that are a little more introspective, a little more mellow. It's just all me, basically, so it's very cool. She later commented on her album again: "'Gold' is more mainstream pop, and I wrote another song that I'm super excited about, and it's one of my favorites that I've ever written...I'm just exploring with a bunch of different sounds. It's been really fun getting to write most of my music."

The song was produced by the Swedish production team the Struts, along with Anne Preven, Jason Weiss, and Peter Thomas.

Music video
Justice released an audio track for the song via her official YouTube account on June 18, 2013. The official music video for the song was directed by Chandler Lass and premiered on July 12, 2013. Colton Haynes flirts with Justice in glamorous scenes in the video.

Live performances
"Gold", as well as "Shake", was a part of the setlist on Justice's second tour, Summer Break Tour (2013).

Track listing
Digital download and streaming
"Gold" – 3:13
"Shake" – 3:34

Streaming
"Gold" – 3:13

Release history

References 

2013 songs
2013 debut singles
Victoria Justice songs
Songs written by Jakob Jerlström
Songs written by Ludvig Söderberg
Songs written by Tove Lo
Columbia Records singles
Torch songs